Cupid's Head is the fourth studio album by Swedish electronic music producer Axel Willner under his alias The Field. It was released by Kompakt on 30 September 2013.

Track listing

Charts

References

2013 albums
The Field (musician) albums
Kompakt albums